El Muerto is a comic book super-hero in the DC Universe created by Oscar Pinto, Francisco Haghenbeck and Carlo Barberi. His first appearance was in Superman (vol. 2) Annual #12.

Fictional character biography
Pablo Valdez, once a young man in Mexico City who idolized Superman, died in a crumbling building while trying to save a small girl from a hostage situation. He was later resurrected through mysticism as an undead hero. Donning an outfit reminiscent of hanging victims, he became El Muerto. In his new incarnation he ceased idolizing Superman and instead began to hate him. El Muerto blamed his death solely on Superman believing that had he been there, he could have prevented the entire incident. He was also critical on the fact that Superman did not help Mexico in fighting crime on the streets and began to do so himself. El Muerto teamed up with fellow heroes Acrata and Iman in defending the streets of Mexico city from the sorcerer Duran. Eventually, El Muerto met The Man of Steel when a girl used her occult energies to destroy half of downtown Mexico City. Superman arrived to give the three superheroes aid, but his vulnerability to magic meant that all four heroes had to unite in order to stop the supernatural menace. El Muerto has since reconciled with his former hero and continues to patrol the streets of Mexico City.

El Muerto was present of other DC mystical figures at Stonehenge in Infinite Crisis #6.

References

Other sources
DC Comics Home Page
Superman Homepage: Superman Annual #12

Undead superheroes
DC Comics male superheroes
DC Comics undead characters
Comics characters introduced in 2000
Fictional characters from Mexico City
Mexican superheroes